Yahyaabad (also Romanized as Yaḩyáābād) is a village in Tarq Rud Rural District, in the Central District of Natanz County, Isfahan Province, Iran. At the 2006 census, its population was 168, in 41 families.

References 

Populated places in Natanz County